Ternatin is a mushroom heptapeptide that suppresses hyperglycemia in vivo.

References

Fungi and humans
Peptides